Four on the Floor is a sketch comedy series which aired on CBC Television in 1986. Consisting of only 13 episodes, the series was a showcase for The Frantics, a comedy troupe consisting of Paul Chato, Rick Green, Dan Redican and Peter Wildman. In the U.K., it aired in Channel 4's traditional Friday night comedy slot, from 10 June to 2 September 1988.

The introduction was voiced by Dan and Rick alternating each line, with video clips and sound effects interspersed in the opening.

Although the series was quickly cancelled due to CBC budget constraints, it was an important influence on later Canadian sketch comedy, such as The Kids in the Hall.

Character
The show's most famous character was Mr. Canoehead, a quintessentially Canadian superhero: on a canoeing trip in Algonquin Park, he was hit by lightning while portaging his aluminum canoe, which became permanently welded to his head. As a crime fighter, he would capture criminals by turning around so that the canoe knocked them over.

See also

Boot to the Head
The Kids in the Hall
History Bites
The Red Green Show

References

External links
 
Profile of Mr. Canoehead

CBC Television original programming
1980s Canadian sketch comedy television series
1986 Canadian television series debuts
1986 Canadian television series endings